The Kaohsiung Harbor Museum is a museum in Gushan District, Kaohsiung, Taiwan dedicated to the preservation of artifacts on the development of Port of Kaohsiung.

History
The museum building was built in 1916 and completed in 1917 to be used as Kaohsiung Harbor's Customs and Duties Office during the Japanese rule of Taiwan. In 1943, it became the Harbor Affairs Bureau and served as the headquarter of Port of Kaohsiung. It had then been used as the office for government-related agencies throughout the history until 1994 when it became vacant and subject to demolition. However, owing to its historical value, the office was renovated in 1997 and transformed into Kaohsiung Harbor Museum. In 2002, the museum was officially opened to the public in conjunction with the anniversary of Kaohsiung Harbor Bureau.

Architecture
The museum is a two-story building built in classical British brick building. Each of the exterior and interior wall is decorated differently to showcase the rich and diverse architectural elements in a perfect harmony. Despite the renovation, the overall appearance of the building remains almost unchanged.

Transportation
The museum is accessible within walking distance South East from Sizihwan Station of Kaohsiung MRT.

See also
List of museums in Taiwan

References

Museums in Kaohsiung
2002 establishments in Taiwan
Government buildings completed in 1917
Gushan District
Museums established in 2002